In typography, a dinkus is a typographic symbol which often consists of three spaced asterisks in a horizontal row, i.e.  ∗∗∗ . The symbol has a variety of uses, and it usually denotes an intentional omission or a logical "break" of varying degree in a written work. This latter use is similar to a subsection, and it indicates to the reader that the subsequent text should be re-contextualized. When used this way, the dinkus typically appears centrally aligned on a line of its own with vertical spacing before and after the symbol. The dinkus has been in use in various forms since . Historically, the dinkus was often represented as an asterism, though this use has fallen out of favor and is now nearly obsolete.

Usage

The dinkus is used for various purposes, but many of them are related to an intentional break in the flow of the text.

Subsection break

A dinkus can be used to accentuate a break between subsections of a single overarching section. When an author chooses to use a dinkus to divide a larger section, the intent is to maintain an overall sense of continuity within the overall chapter or section while changing elements of the setting or timeline. For instance, when the writer is introducing a flashback or other jarring scene change, a dinkus can help denote the change in setting within the overall theme of the chapter; in that case, it can be preferable to the initiation of a new chapter. This technique is used especially in literary fiction.

Intentionally omitted information

Many applications of the dinkus, including those that were common historically, have indicated intentional omission of information. In these cases, the dinkus is used to inform the reader that the information has been omitted. It can also be used to mean "untitled" or that the author or title was withheld. This is evident, for example, in some editions of Album for the Young by composer Robert Schumann (№ 21, 26, and 30).

A dinkus can also be used in any context as a simple means of abbreviation of any text. The dinkus is also used specifically in this capacity within the sphere of lawmaking, particularly for city ordinances. When used in legal text, the dinkus indicates an abbreviation within amendments to code while not implying the repeal of the omitted sections.

Ornamentation

Newspapers, magazines, and other works can use dinkuses as simple ornamentation of typography, for solely aesthetic reasons. When a dinkus is used primarily for aesthetic purposes, it often takes the form of a fleuron, e.g. ❧, or sometimes a dingbat. While fleurons, dingbats, and dinkuses are usually distinct, their uses can overlap.

Poetic symbolism

In some cases, the use of a dinkus has been employed in poetry in order to convey non-verbal meaning. This is exemplified in the poem Thresholes by Lara Mimosa Montes, in which the poet makes frequent use of a circular dinkus,  ○ , as a form of "punctuation at the level of the full text, rather than the phrase or the sentence" throughout the course of the work.

Variations

Many variations of dinkuses are composed partially or entirely of asterisks, although other symbols can be used to achieve the same goals. Some examples include a series of dots, fleurons, asterisms, straight horizontal lines, and various other figures, such as infinity symbols.

Gallery

Other uses of the term "dinkus"

Among older Hungarian Americans and Polish Americans, dinkus is an archaic term for Easter Monday.

In Australian English, particularly in the news media, the word "dinkus" refers to a small photograph of the author of a news article. Outside of Australia, this is often referred to as a headshot.

References

Further reading
 Daisy Alioto's analysis of the dinkus in The Paris Review: Ode to the Dinkus.

Typographical symbols
Punctuation